Sodium–hydrogen antiporter 3 also known as sodium–hydrogen exchanger 3 (NHE3) or solute carrier family 9 member 3 (SLC9A3) is a protein that in humans is encoded by the SLC9A3 gene.

SLC9A3 is a sodium–hydrogen antiporter.  It is found on the apical side of the epithelial cells of the proximal tubule of the nephron of the kidney, in the apical membrane of enterocytes of the intestine, as well as the basolateral side of both duodenal and pancreatic cells responsible for the release of HCO−3 into the duodenal lumen. It is primarily responsible for maintaining the balance of sodium.  It is also indirectly linked to buffering of blood pH.  The  NHE3 antiporter imports one sodium ion into the cytosol of a tubule cell as it ejects one hydrogen ion from the cell into the lumen of the proximal tubule.  The sodium within the tubule cell may then be retained by the body rather than excreted in the urine.  The NHE3 antiporter indirectly contributes to blood buffering capacity because hydrogen ions that are ejected are the products of the carbonic anhydrase enzyme, which also makes bicarbonate.

Regulation 

Protein kinase C stimulates NHE3, while protein kinase A inhibits it.

There is a specific protein functioning as an NHE3 regulator, Sodium-hydrogen antiporter 3 regulator 1.

Inhibitors 

 Tenapanor

Stimulators 

 Insulin stimulates NHE3 and thereby proximal tubule sodium absorption.

Interactions 

Sodium–hydrogen antiporter 3 has been shown to interact with CHP.

References

Further reading

External links 
 

Solute carrier family